Karl-Heinz Frieser (born 1949 in Pressath, Bavaria) is a German military historian and a retired colonel of the German Army.

Life
Frieser joined the German Army in 1970 and started studying political science as well as history in 1978. In 1981 he acquired a doctorate degree with his thesis Die deutschen Kriegsgefangenen in der Sowjetunion und das Nationalkomitee "Freies Deutschland" (German prisoners of war in the Soviet Union  and the National Committee for a Free Germany). After that, he was one of the principal researchers in the German Armed Forces Military History Research Office (Militärgeschichtliches Forschungsamt or MGFA). He published an account of the German war against France, denouncing the Blitzkrieg myth, which was translated into several languages (The Blitzkrieg Legend: The 1940 Campaign in the West). He was also one of the principal researches for the German semi-official history project Germany and the Second World War.

In 2009 he retired from the MGFA.

Works
Die deutschen Kriegsgefangenen in der Sowjetunion und das Nationalkomitee "Freies Deutschland", Würzburg, 1981
The Blitzkrieg Legend: The 1940 Campaign in the West,  Naval Institute Press; 1st edition, 2005, 
Ardennen – Sedan. Militärhistorischer Führer durch eine europäische Schicksalslandschaft, Frankfurt a.M./Bonn, 2000,

References

External links
 
 Publication list of the MGFA

1949 births
Living people
People from Neustadt an der Waldnaab (district)
German military historians
Historians of World War II
German Army personnel
German male non-fiction writers
20th-century German historians
21st-century German historians
Military personnel from Bavaria